All About Love is the fifth studio album by Filipina singer-songwriter Yeng Constantino, released in the Philippines on November 25, 2014 by Star Music. This album was also the first-full Filipino album to be released on Spotify. The album peaked at number 5 on the Philippine Top-Selling Albums chart.

Background

All About Love is Constantino's attempt to tackle new genres beyond her mostly pop-rock image, and serves as a prelude to her wedding with fellow musician Yan Asuncion, which was to be held on February 14, 2015. The 10-track album includes two songs originally composed by Constantino, three songs written and composed by Asuncion, and the other songs by some of her favorite composers in the local music industry. The single "Ikaw" preceded the album, released with a music video on August 23, 2014.

Track listing

Note 

Writer credits based on a news released by ABS-CBN Public Relations website.

Release history

References

Yeng Constantino albums
2014 albums
Star Music albums